The Shepherd Girl (Persian: Dokhtare choopan) is a 1953 Iranian drama film directed by Moezzodivan Fekri. It follows the relationship of Ziba and Ahmed. Ahmed's family try to separate him from Ziba in the hopes that he will marry a wealthy girl.

Partial cast
 Moezzodivan Fekri
 Majid Mohseni
 Taghi Zohuri

References

Bibliography 
 Mohammad Ali Issari. Cinema in Iran, 1900-1979. Scarecrow Press, 1989.

External links 
 

1953 films
1953 drama films
Iranian drama films
1950s Persian-language films
Films directed by Moezzodivan Fekri
Iranian black-and-white films